Spaniblennius riodourensis is a species of combtooth blenny  found in the eastern Atlantic Ocean, from Mauritania to Morocco.  This species reaches  in SL.

References

riodourensis
Taxa named by Jan Marie Metzelaar
Fish described in 1919